Lefebvre is a common northern French surname. Other variations include Lefèbvre, Lefèvre, Lefeuvre (western France) and Lefébure (northern France and Normandy).

In the Occitan and Arpitan extension area, the variation is Fabre, Favre, Faure, Favret, Favrette or Dufaure and in Corsica Fabri (cf. Italian Fabbri, Fabri). In Celtic-speaking Brittany, the corresponding name is Le Goff(ic), with the article le to translate Breton ar.

For Anglophone pronunciation purposes, the name has evolved, especially in the United States and Anglophone regions of Canada mainly by Acadians, among whom it is also a common surname, to LaFave, LeFave, Lefever and Lafevre, as well as other variant spellings. The English surname Feaver is also derived from Lefebvre.  (See Lefèvre for more.)

The name derives from faber, the Latin word for "craftsman", "worker"; used in Late Latin in Gaul to mean smith. Many northern French surnames (especially in Normandy) are used with the definite masculine article as a prefix (Lefebvre, Lefèvre; a more archaic spelling is Le Febvre), with the contracted masculine article as a prefix (Dufaure) in the south of France, or without article/prefix (Favre, Faure) in the south of France, but the meaning is the same.

People

Lefebvre
 Alain Lefebvre (born 1947), French journalist
 Arlette Lefebvre (born 1947), Canadian child psychologist
 Arthur H. Lefebvre (1923–2003), research engineer and scientist
 Benny Lefebvre (1912–1994), American athlete and sports coach
 Bernard Lefebvre (1929-1999), Canadian surgeon and director of Royal College of Physicians and Surgeons
 Bill Lefebvre (1915–2007), American baseball player, coach, and scout
 Camille Lefebvre (1831–1895), French Catholic missionary
 Catherine Lefebvre (curler) (born 1959), French curler
 Charles-Édouard Lefebvre (1843–1917), French composer
 Claude Lefebvre (artist) (1633–1675), French painter and engraver
 Claude Lefebvre (handballer) (born 1952), former Canadian handball player who competed in the 1976 Summer Olympics
 Claude Lefebvre (ice hockey) (born 1964), Canadian ice hockey player and coach 
 Elsie Lefebvre (born 1979), Canadian politician from Quebec
 Émile Lefebvre, French playwright
 Éric Lefebvre (born 1971), Canadian politician from Quebec
 Eugène Lefebvre (1878–1909), French aviator, second person to be killed in an airplane crash
 François Joseph Lefebvre (1755–1820), French marshal during Napoleonic Wars, Duke of Gdańsk
 Frédéric Lefebvre (born 1963), French politician
 Georges Lefebvre (1874–1959), French historian
 Germaine Lefebvre (1933–1990), French actress professionally known as Capucine
 Guillaume Lefebvre (born 1981), Canadian ice hockey player
 Gustave Lefebvre (1879–1957), French Egyptologist
 Henri Lefebvre (1901–1991), French philosopher, sociologist, and intellectual 
 Jean Lefebvre (1922–2004), French actor
 Jean Baptiste Lefebvre de Villebrune (1732-1809), French physician, philologist, and translator
 Jim Lefebvre (born 1942), American baseball player
 Joe Lefebvre (born 1956), American baseball player
 Jules Joseph Lefebvre (1836–1911), French painter
 Kristine Lefebvre, American lawyer and contestant on The Apprentice
 Louise-Rosalie Lefebvre (1751–1821), French actress, dancer, and singer
 Ludo Lefebvre (born 1971), French chef
 Loïc Lefebvre (born 1976), French chef
 Marcel Lefebvre (1905–1991), French Catholic archbishop
 René Lefebvre (1879–1944), French factory owner, active in the Resistance, father of Marcel 
 Roland Lefebvre (born 1963), Dutch cricket player
 Sébastien Lefebvre, French-Canadian musician
 Ségolène Lefebvre (born 1993), French boxer
 Stéphane Lefebvre (born 1992), French rally driver
 Sylvain Lefebvre (born 1967), Canadian ice hockey player
 Tim Lefebvre (born 1968), American musician
 Vladimir Lefebvre, American mathematician

Lefèbvre
 André Lefèbvre (1894–1964), French automobile engineer
 Hippolyte-Jules Lefèbvre (1863–1935), French sculptor
 Joseph-Charles Lefèbvre (1892–1973), French Catholic archbishop

Le Febvre
 Charles-Hugues Le Febvre de Saint-Marc (1698–1772), French playwright

Combined with other surnames
 Charles Lefebvre-Desnouettes (or Lefèbvre-Desnoëttes; 1773–1822), French peer and general

See also
 Fabre (disambiguation)
 Faure
 Favre
 Febvre (disambiguation)
 Lefèvre
 Lefebre
 Lefébure
 Smith (surname)

References

French-language surnames
Surnames of French origin
Occupational surnames
Lists of people by surname
eo:Ĝermolisto de francaj esperantistoj#Lefebvre